Danilovka is a rural locality (a village) in Tolpukhovskoye Rural Settlement, Sobinsky District, Vladimir Oblast, Russia. The population was 13 as of 2010.

Geography 
Danilovka is located 30 km north of Sobinka (the district's administrative centre) by road. Kishleyevo is the nearest rural locality.

References 

Rural localities in Sobinsky District